Turkish Hockey Federation (THF) is the governing body of the field hockey and indoor field hockey sports in Turkey. It was established on February 6, 2002. It is a member of the International Hockey Federation (FIH) since December 5, 2002. The THF is based in Ankara and its current chairman is Orhan Duman. The federation is chaired by Sadık Karakan since September 5, 2009.

History

Domestic events
The federation organizes tournaments and leagues for both gender in the U10, U12, U14, U16, U18, U21 and senior categories.

Men
 Turkish Men's Indoor Hockey Super League
 Turkish Men's Hockey Super League
 Turkish U18 Boys' Indoor Hockey Championships 
 Turkish U18 Boys' Field Hockey Championships (18 teams)

Women
 Turkish Women's Indoor Hockey Super League
 Turkish Women's Hockey Super League
 Turkish U18 Girls' Indoor Hockey Championships  
 Turkish U18 Girls' Field Hockey Championships (16 teams)

International participation
Turkey national teams of men and women participate in EuroHockey competitions in the U18 (youth), U21 (junior) and senior categories.

Men
 Eurohockey Men's Indoor Club Challenge I
 Eurohockey Men's Indoor Junior Championship II
 Eurohockey Men’s Club Champions Challenge III
 Eurohockey Boy's Youth Championship II
 Eurohockey Men's Championship III

Women
 Eurohockey Women's Indoor Club Challenge I
 Eurohockey Women's Indoor Junior Championship II
 Eurohockey Women’s Club Champions Challenge III
 Eurohockey Girls' Youth Championship III
 Eurohockey Women's Championship III

References

External links
 European Hockey Federation (EHF)

Hockey
Sports organizations established in 2002
Federation
2002 establishments in Turkey
Organizations based in Ankara
National members of the European Hockey Federation